In human computer interaction, the gulf of execution is the gap between a user's goal for action and the means to execute that goal. Usability has as one of its primary goals to reduce this gap by removing roadblocks and steps that cause extra thinking and actions that distract the user's attention from the task intended, thereby preventing the flow of his or her work, and decreasing the chance of successful completion of the task. Similarly, there is a gulf of evaluation that applies to the gap between an external stimulus and the time a person understands what it means. Both phrases are first mentioned in Donald Norman's 1986 book User Centered System Design: New Perspectives on Human-computer Interaction.

Example 
This can be illustrated through the discussion of a VCR problem. Let us imagine that a user would like to record a television show. They see the solution to this problem as simply pressing the Record button. However, in reality, to record a show on a VCR, several actions must be taken:

 Press the record button.
 Specify time of recording, usually involving several steps to change the hour and minute settings.
 Select channel to record on - either by entering the channel's number or selecting it with up/down buttons.
 Save the recording settings, perhaps by pressing an "OK" or "menu" or "enter" button.

The difference between the user's perceived execution actions and the required actions is the gulf of execution.

See also
Human action cycle
Gulf of evaluation

References

External links
A good description of the Gulf of execution on a website

Human–computer interaction